Jorge Quintanal (born 27 August 1974) is a Guatemalan judoka. He competed in the men's half-lightweight event at the 2000 Summer Olympics.

References

1974 births
Living people
Guatemalan male judoka
Olympic judoka of Guatemala
Judoka at the 2000 Summer Olympics
Place of birth missing (living people)